Yarım Kalan Aşklar (English: Unfinished Love Circle) is an action and fantasy Turkish internet series by BluTV and Tims & B Productions starring Burak Deniz and Dilan Çiçek Deniz. The series was released on September 10, 2020. It is directed by Umur Turagay and written by Ethem Özışık, Hakan Bonomo and Ercan Uğur.

Plot 
Journalist Ozan is about to marry Elif who is a journalist like himself. Ozan, who is fond of investigative journalism, pursues mysterious and difficult news. His happy life with Elif ends after a terrible event: Ozan loses his life after being hit by a car. However, he finds himself resurrected in a new body again. Returning to life with another body, Ozan has two challenging tasks: to find out who killed him and to tell Elif all the facts.

Notes 
The role was previously offered to Hande Erçel, who was supposed to play instead of Dilan Çiçek Deniz but because of her on going series Sen Çal Kapımı she couldn’t take a part. And the role of Nejat Amir was supposed to be played by Ali Atay but later he also gave up.

Cast 
 Burak Deniz as Mehmet Kadir Bilmez/Ozan
 Dilan Çiçek Deniz as Elif Urazoğlu
 Cem Davran as Nejat Amir
 Ezel Akay as Ayı İsmet
 Tolga Sarıtaş as Ozan
 Esra Ruşan as Saadet
 Nazlı Bulum as Ebru
 Muhammad Abdullah as Ehsan
 Cihat Süvarioğlu as Mehmet
 Gizem Ünsal as Ece

References

External links
 

2020 Turkish television series debuts
2020 Turkish television series endings
Turkish action television series
Turkish-language television shows
Television shows set in Istanbul